Letting Go is the sixth studio album by Contemporary Christian music and folk rock singer Jennifer Knapp. The album was released on May 11, 2010, on Graylin Records.

Critical reception

James Christopher Monger of AllMusic concludes his review with, "Knapp claws her way through to truths both cathartic and disappointing, all the while maintaining an engaging, wounded swagger and a radio-ready sheen that brings to mind contemporaries like Brandi Carlile and Kathleen Edwards."

Laura Nunnery Love of Jesus Freak Hideout gives this album 4 out of a possible 5 stars and begins her review with, "In 2002, Jennifer Knapp walked away from a successful music career and disappeared into the Australian outback. After eight years of silence, the small-town Kansas girl with a dry sense of humor is back, and she has a lot to say. Letting Go is both classic Knapp and unlike anything else she has released, an interesting dynamic that is sure to polarize fans. It is also some of her best work to date."

Andrea Bailey Willits of Christianity Today gives the album 4 out of 5 stars and writes, "On Letting Go, the Kansas native's lyrics are grittier and more passionate than ever."

In an interview with Knapp, Nancy Dunham of The Washington Examiner writes, "Produced by Paul Moak, the songs on the May release are something akin to a country/pop/indie journey through Knapp's recent life."

Doug Van Pelt, writing for HM Magazine begins his review, "Singer songwriter Jennifer Knapp’s latest album, Letting Go, debuts at #73 on the Billboard Top 200 Album Chart." and concludes, "With a considerable fan base, critical and commercial successes, Knapp walked away from it all at the height of her career. After seven years of soul searching and time spent in Australia, Knapp comes full circle with Letting Go."

Track listing

Musicians 
1 – "Dive In"
 Jennifer Knapp – acoustic guitar, lead vocals, backing vocals
 Cason Cooley – Hammond B3 organ, keyboards
 Paul Moak – electric guitar
 Tony Lucido – bass
 Will Sayles – drums, percussion

2 – "Want For Nothing"
 Jennifer Knapp – acoustic guitar, lead vocals, backing vocals
 Cason Cooley – acoustic piano, keyboards
 Paul Moak – electric guitar, 12-string acoustic guitar
 Tony Lucido – bass
 Will Sayles – drums, percussion

3 – "Fallen"
 Jennifer Knapp – acoustic guitar, lead vocals, backing vocals
 Cason Cooley – upright piano, Hammond B3 organ
 Paul Moak – acoustic guitar, pedal steel guitar, electric guitar
 Matt Pierson – bass
 Will Sayles – drums, percussion

4 – "Oh Love"
 Jennifer Knapp – acoustic guitar, lead vocals, backing vocals
 Cason Cooley – acoustic piano, keyboards
 Paul Moak – electric guitar, backing vocals
 Tony Lucido – bass
 Will Sayles – drums, percussion
 Claire Indie – cello

5 – "Inside"
 Jennifer Knapp – acoustic guitar, lead vocals, backing vocals
 Cason Cooley – keyboards
 Paul Moak – electric guitar
 Tony Lucido – bass
 Will Sayles – drums

6 – "Letting Go"
 Jennifer Knapp – acoustic guitar, lead vocals
 Cason Cooley – Hammond B3 organ, keyboards
 Paul Moak – electric guitar, backing vocals
 Matt Pierson – bass
 Will Sayles – drums, percussion

7 – "Mr. Gray"
 Jennifer Knapp – acoustic guitar, lead vocals, backing vocals
 Cason Cooley – keyboards, pump organ
 Paul Moak – acoustic guitar, mando-guitar, vibraphone
 Matt Pierson – bass
 Will Sayles – percussion

8 – "Better Off"
 Jennifer Knapp – acoustic guitar, vocals
 Cason Cooley – keyboards
 Paul Moak – mando-guitar, pedal steel guitar
 Tony Lucido – bass
 Will Sayles – drums, percussion

9 – "If It Made A Difference"
 Jennifer Knapp – acoustic guitar, lead vocals, backing vocals
 Cason Cooley – acoustic piano, keyboards
 Paul Moak – acoustic guitar, electric guitar
 Matt Pierson – bass
 Will Sayles – drums, percussion

10 – "Stone To The River"
 Jennifer Knapp – acoustic guitar, lead vocals, backing vocals
 Cason Cooley – acoustic piano, Hammond B3 organ, pump organ
 Paul Moak – electric guitar, 12-string acoustic guitar, backing vocals
 Tony Lucido – bass
 Will Sayles – drums, percussion
 Claire Indie – cello

Production 
 John Huie – executive producer
 Mitchell Solarek – executive producer, A&R direction, management
 Paul Moak – producer, engineer
 Justin March – assistant engineer
 F. Reid Shippen – mixing at Robot Lemon (Nashville, Tennessee)
 Erik "Keller" Jahner – mix assistant
 Andrew Mendelson – mastering at Georgetown Masters (Nashville, Tennessee)
 Nattihaphol Abhigantophand – mastering assistant
 Shelley Anderson – mastering assistant
Daniel Bacigalupi – mastering assistant
 Fairlight Hubbard – art direction, photography, stylist
 Amy M. Phillips – art direction, photography, stylist
 Kristi Brazell – A&R coordinator

Track information and credits adapted from Discogs and AllMusic, then verified from the album's liner notes.

Charts

References

2010 albums
Jennifer Knapp albums